Rich Passage is a tidal strait in Puget Sound, allowing access to Bremerton, Washington,  Sinclair Inlet, and Dyes Inlet. It separates Bainbridge Island from the Manchester area of Kitsap Peninsula. Due to the activities at Puget Sound Naval Shipyard, Rich Passage has a high volume of marine traffic. The Seattle-Bremerton ferry, part of the Washington State Ferries, travels the length of Rich Passage on its route.

In addition to the many ferry trips each way per day, tugs with hawser tows and various types of naval and recreational craft all contribute to a considerable collision hazard, particularly at the sharp bend off Point Glover.  Strong tidal conditions prevail in this vicinity, and deep-draft outbound vessels making the sharp turn may be unavoidably set well over to the eastern shore.

Fort Ward State Park and Manchester State Park are on the Rich Passage waterfront.

Rich Passage was named by Charles Wilkes during the Wilkes Expedition of 1838–1842, to honor William Rich, the expedition's botanist.

References

Bainbridge Island, Washington
Straits of Kitsap County, Washington
Straits of Washington (state)
Landforms of Puget Sound
Transportation in Kitsap County, Washington